Tatayet is a Belgian puppet, operated by Belgian ventriloquist Michel Dejeneffe since 15 December 1975.  Dejeneffe performed the character on stage in theater shows for more than 40 years and recorded comedy records with him.

TV show

In the 1980s Tatayet became more prominent in Walloon media thanks to the popular children's TV show Le Tatayet Show (1986-1992), which was broadcast on the RTBF. They even had a minor hit dance single called Tous au Cimetière (1986).

Media adaptations

In 1990 two comic books albums, C'est pas moi, c'est lui (1990) and C'est pas lui c'est moi were made about the TV series, written by Raoul Cauvin and drawn by Olivier Saive.

Retirement
In 2017 Dejeneffe announced he would retire the character, as well as quit performing on stage.

Sources

Fictional beavers
Belgian children's television shows
Belgian comedy television shows
1986 Belgian television series debuts
1992 Belgian television series endings
Belgian television shows featuring puppetry
Television shows adapted into comics
French-language television programming in Belgium
Fictional characters introduced in 1975